Almlöf is a Swedish surname that may refer to
Betty Deland (later Almlöf 1831–1882), Swedish actress, wife of Knut
Charlotta Almlöf (1813–1882), Swedish stage actress, wife of Nils
Erik Almlöf (1891–1971), Swedish triple jumper
Knut Almlöf (1829–1899), Swedish actor, husband of Betty
Nils Almlöf (1799–1875), Swedish actor, husband of Charlotta

Swedish-language surnames